Robert Stockton Williamson (January 21, 1825 – November 10, 1882) was an American soldier and engineer, noted for conducting surveys for the transcontinental railroad in California and Oregon. Inducted into the Army Corps of Engineers in 1861, he had a distinguished record serving in the American Civil War, winning two brevet promotions. When the US Army Corps of Engineers established its San Francisco District office in 1866, he was appointed as the first commander of the office. Formally promoted to the rank of lieutenant colonel in 1869, he retired in 1871, because of health problems, and died in San Francisco in 1882.

Early life and career
Williamson was born in Oxford, New York and lived in Elizabeth, New Jersey. He was named after Commodore Robert F. Stockton, a family friend. He joined the Navy in 1843 as a master's mate under Stockton on the USS Princeton, the first screw-driven steam ship in the Navy. Williamson was detached from the ship 10 days before one of its guns exploded, killing several people.

It was through Stockton's influence that Williamson was appointed to the United States Military Academy. He graduated fifth in his class in 1848 and appointed a second lieutenant in the Corps of Topographical Engineers. He was assigned to conduct surveys for proposed routes for the transcontinental railroad in California and Oregon. He was then assigned to the staff of the commanding general of the Department of the Pacific, and was the engineer in charge of the military roads in southern Oregon.

Civil War
After the outbreak of the American Civil War, Williamson was commissioned with the rank of Captain into the 1st Battalion of Engineers, and was the Chief Topographical Engineer in North Carolina. He was brevetted Major on March 14, 1862, for service at the Battle of New Bern, and brevetted a Lieutenant Colonel at the Battle of Fort Macon on April 26, 1862. He was then assigned as Chief Topographical Engineer for the Army of the Potomac. Williamson returned to California as the Chief Topographical Engineer of the Department of the Pacific. He was formally promoted to the rank of Major on May 7, 1863,

In 1863, Williamson transferred to the Corps of Engineers and served as lighthouse engineer for the Pacific Coast. He also worked on defenses and harbors along the coast.

Postbellum
In 1866, Major Williamson was appointed Commander and Officer-in-Charge when the U. S. Army Corps of Engineers established its San Francisco District Office in 1866. This office was then mainly responsible for engineering related to rivers and harbors along the entire Pacific coast, from Canada to Mexico, and included Hawaii. He remained in this position until 1871.

He was formally promoted to Lieutenant Colonel on February 2, 1869.

In 1870, he was elected as a member to the American Philosophical Society.

He retired from the Army as a lieutenant colonel in 1882, due to illness. Williamson had suffered from bad health for the last 20 years of his life and died of tuberculosis in San Francisco, California. He was buried at the Masonic Cemetery in San Francisco.

Legacy
In California, Mount Williamson is named for him. 
Williamson Mountain and the Williamson River in Oregon are named in his honor.
A western North American woodpecker, the Williamson's sapsucker, and the mountain whitefish, Prosopium williamsoni, are named after him.
Williamson Valley (Arizona) is named after him.

Notes

References

External links

 Report Upon the Removal of Blossom Rock San Francisco Harbor, California. Williamson, R. S. and W. H. Heuer. 1870.

1825 births
1882 deaths
People from Elizabeth, New Jersey
United States Army Corps of Topographical Engineers
United States Military Academy alumni
United States Army officers
American explorers
Union Army officers
People from Oxford, New York
Engineers from New York (state)
Engineers from New Jersey
Burials at Masonic Cemetery (San Francisco)
Military personnel from New Jersey